Mionochroma aureotinctum is a species of beetle in the family Cerambycidae. It was described by Henry Walter Bates in 1870. It is known from Mexico, Panama, the Guianas, Peru, and Brazil.

References

Cerambycinae
Beetles described in 1870